Thor Halvorssen may refer to:

 Thor Halvorssen (businessman) (1943–2014), Venezuelan businessman, special commissioner for international narcotic affairs, with the rank of ambassador
 Thor Halvorssen (human rights activist) (born 1976), his son, film producer and founder of Human Rights Foundation